George Washington "Zip" Zabel (February 18, 1891, Wetmore, Kansas—May 31, 1970, Beloit, Wisconsin) was a professional baseball pitcher. He played all or part of three seasons in Major League Baseball in 1913-15 for the Chicago Cubs.

Zabel attended Baker University, in Baldwin City, Kansas, where he earned a bachelor's degree in 1916 in chemistry.

On June 17, 1915, Zabel set the record for most innings pitched in relief in one game. He came into the game in relief for Bert Humphries with two outs in the first inning, and pitched the final  innings to earn the win over the Brooklyn Robins (now the Los Angeles Dodgers) and opposing pitcher Jeff Pfeffer, who pitched the complete game.

After that game, Zabel only played one more start in the majors, as he had begun to experience arm trouble as a result of the game. He then played two years in the minors in Los Angeles and Toronto before retiring from baseball in July 1917. Afterwards, he went to work for Fairbanks Morse in Beloit, Wisconsin, where he eventually rose to the position of chief metallurgist. He continued to work there in various capacities for the next 32 years.

After moving to Beloit, he played for their city baseball team for a season.

In 1919, Zabel became a referee for Beloit's city football team. The only game he is infamously known for as a referee is the game between the Green Bay Packers and Beloit on November 23. In the game he was accused of many bad calls by George Calhoun, Green Bay's manager. Those calls included mistakenly adding 5 seconds to the clock before half time, taking away a Packers touchdown by instead placing the ball at the 2, calling a non-existent offsides penalty on the Packers on the subsequent play, which also would have been a touchdown, and not calling fan interference when a fan stepped on the field and tripped Packers quarterback Orlo McLean, who was running downfield.

Notes

References

External links
A Wetmore, Kansas page, with a good picture of Zabel
Zip Zabel at Baseball-Almanac.com

Major League Baseball pitchers
Chicago Cubs players
Youngstown Steelmen players
Appleton Papermakers players
Winnipeg Maroons (baseball) players
Kansas City Blues (baseball) players
Toledo Mud Hens players
Los Angeles Angels (minor league) players
Toronto Maple Leafs (International League) players
Baker Wildcats baseball players
Baseball players from Kansas
Sportspeople from Beloit, Wisconsin
People from Nemaha County, Kansas
1891 births
1970 deaths